Brevibacterium iodinum is a Gram-positive soil bacterium. It can often be found among the normal cutaneous flora of healthy people, particularly in humid environments, and is only very rarely involved in opportunistic infections. It is also suspected to be a cause of foot odor.

References

External links
Type strain of Brevibacterium iodinum at BacDive -  the Bacterial Diversity Metadatabase

Micrococcales
Soil biology
Hygiene
Bacteria described in 1981